Ranfurly is a town in the Central Otago District of Otago, New Zealand. It operates as a service town for the local farming community. The town was formerly known as Eweburn, one of the "farmyard" names bestowed by former Otago Chief Surveyor John Turnbull Thomson on many small streams and locations in the district. The modern name honours the Fifth Earl of Ranfurly, who served as Governor of New Zealand (1897–1904) at the time of the extension of the Otago Central Railway to the area. Ranfurly is well known for its Art Deco buildings, such as its hotel and the milk bar.

History

During the Central Otago goldrush of the 1860s, several important deposits of the precious metal were found near Ranfurly, notably at Kyeburn and Naseby, close to the southwestern face of the Kakanui Range.

After the gold-rush faded Ranfurly grew at the expense of Naseby, spurred by the arrival of the railway in 1898. The rail line was closed in 1989 and the track removed, but its course became a major walking and cycling route, the Otago Central Rail Trail, which attracts tourists. The former railway station now serves as a museum and display centre.

The town became an important service-centre for the rural community, experiencing a building boom in the 1930s. It has a large proportion of rural Art Deco buildings which have been preserved from that time. An annual festival commemorating Ranfurly's Art Deco heritage used to take place each February. 

The nearby Ida Valley functioned as one of the locations for Peter Jackson's 2001–2003 Lord of the Rings film trilogy, representing the wide plains of Rohan.

Climate
Under the Köppen climate classification Ranfurly has an oceanic climate (Cfb), with continental influence.

Central Otago in general, and the Maniototo in particular, has one of New Zealand's very few zones influenced by continental climates, with large daily and seasonal temperature extremes. The lowest temperature on record in New Zealand was recorded at Ranfurly in 1903. Heavy frosts are common throughout winter.

The town is sheltered from the prevailing rain patterns by the mountains to the west.

Demographics
Ranfurly is described by Statistics New Zealand as a rural settlement. It is part of the much larger Maniototo statistical area. 

Ranfurly had a population of 726 at the 2018 New Zealand census, an increase of 60 people (9.0%) since the 2013 census, and an increase of 12 people (1.7%) since the 2006 census. There were 333 households. There were 348 males and 375 females, giving a sex ratio of 0.93 males per female, with 90 people (12.4%) aged under 15 years, 93 (12.8%) aged 15 to 29, 288 (39.7%) aged 30 to 64, and 246 (33.9%) aged 65 or older.

Ethnicities were 91.3% European/Pākehā, 12.8% Māori, 1.2% Pacific peoples, 3.3% Asian, and 0.4% other ethnicities (totals add to more than 100% since people could identify with multiple ethnicities).

Although some people objected to giving their religion, 43.4% had no religion, 48.8% were Christian, 0.4% were Hindu and 0.8% had other religions.

Of those at least 15 years old, 48 (7.5%) people had a bachelor or higher degree, and 192 (30.2%) people had no formal qualifications. The employment status of those at least 15 was that 252 (39.6%) people were employed full-time, 105 (16.5%) were part-time, and 9 (1.4%) were unemployed.

Sport
Ranfurly lies close to the heart of New Zealand's curling-playing region, and the local club have represented New Zealand at the 1999, 2004, and 2005 World Championships (finishing tenth, seventh and eighth respectively), as well as providing members for the New Zealand 2006 Winter Olympics curling team.

Ranfurly has been the birthplace of several recent members of the New Zealand women's (field) hockey team.

Education

The school has predecessors from 1879.

It was established in 1945.

Notable people
 Sean Becker, curler
 Shane Collins, field hockey player
 John Grenell, country singer
 Andrew Hore, All Black
 Robert Logan, military leader and politician
 Warren McSkimming, cricketer
 Peter Petherick, cricketer and lawn bowls player
 Mandy Smith, field hockey player
 Isobel Thomson, field hockey player
 David Kilgour, musician

References

Populated places in Otago
Central Otago District
Art Deco architecture in New Zealand